"The Night You Murdered Love" is a song by English band ABC, released as the second single from their fourth studio album, Alphabet City (1987). It peaked at No. 31 on the UK Singles Chart.

Music video
The music video shows a homicidal fashion model carrying a slingshot and a skateboard stalking the band across the city of Paris.

Track listing
7" single
"The Night You Murdered Love" – 4:53
"Minneapolis" – 2:57

US 12" single
A1 "The Night You Murdered Love" (Sheer Chic Mix) – 6:31
Mixed by – The Funky Sisters, Pete Hammond
A2 "Minneapolis" – 2:57
B1 "The Night You Murdered Love" (The Whole Story) – 8:14
Rap [Featuring] – Contessa Lady V
B2 "The Night You Murdered Love" (The Reply) – 4:50
Rap [Featuring] – Contessa Lady V
B3 "The Night You Murdered Love" (Bonus Beats) – 4:53

Chart performance

References

External links
 

ABC (band) songs
1987 singles
Songs written by Mark White (musician)
Songs written by Martin Fry
1987 songs
Mercury Records singles